The ninth season of the Bleach anime series is named . The series is based on Tite Kubo's Bleach manga series. The episodes are directed by Noriyuki Abe, and produced by TV Tokyo, Dentsu and Studio Pierrot. The season is an original, self-contained filler story arc that focuses on the introduction of a new Soul Reaper captain, Shūsuke Amagai, and the mystery surrounding the Kasumiōji clan, one of the families that constitute the nobility of Soul Society. It is the first season of the anime series to be produced in 16:9 widescreen.

The season aired from April to October 2008. The English adaptation of the Bleach anime is licensed by Viz Media, and this arc began airing on August 29, 2010 on Cartoon Network's Adult Swim, and finished on January 30, 2011. Five DVD compilations, each containing four episodes of the season, have been released by Aniplex; the first DVD compilation was released on November 26, 2008 and the fifth on March 25, 2009. A DVD box set was published by Viz Media on December 13, 2011. 

The episodes use three pieces of theme music: one opening theme and two closing themes. The opening theme is "Chu-Bura" by Kelun. The first closing theme is "Orange" by Lil'B, used for episodes 168 to 179, and the second closing theme is "Gallop" by pe'zmoku, used for the remainder of the episodes.



Episode list

References

General

Specific

2008 Japanese television seasons
Season 09